Culture Shock were a short lived Australian dance trio consisting of Lorena Novoa, Paul Brandoli and Victoria Wu. Culture Shock released one studio album.

Discography

Albums

Singles

References

Musical groups from Sydney
1993 establishments in Australia
1995 disestablishments in Australia
Musical groups established in 1993
Musical groups disestablished in 1995